Avinashi taluk is a taluk of Tirupur district of the Indian state of Tamil Nadu. The headquarters of the taluk is the town of Avinashi.

Demographics
According to the 2011 census, the taluk of Avinashi had a population of 337923 with 168055  males and 169868 females. There were 1011 women for every 1000 men. The taluk had a literacy rate of 68.05. Child population in the age group below 6 was 15424 Males and 14709 Females.

References 

Taluks of Tiruppur district